Coal Township may refer to the following townships in the United States:

 Coal Township, Northumberland County, Pennsylvania
 Coal Township, Jackson County, Ohio
 Coal Township, Perry County, Ohio
 Coal Township, Vernon County, Missouri